Patrick Sunderman is an American sport shooter. He represents USA at the 2020 Summer Olympics in Tokyo.

He is a sergeant in the United States Army and serves as a shooter/instructor with the international team of the Army Marksmanship Unit.

References

1994 births
Living people
American military Olympians
American male sport shooters
Shooters at the 2020 Summer Olympics
Olympic shooters of the United States
People from Farmington, Minnesota
United States Army non-commissioned officers